Matti Pohjola is a noted economist working on the economics of growth, productivity, technological change, and most notably information and communications technology. He is a professor at the Helsinki School of Economics and is the editor of the Finnish Economic Journal. Matti Pohjola is the Deputy Director of the World Institute for Development Economics Research (WIDER), United Nations University, and Professor of Economics, Helsinki School of Economics and Business Administration. He holds a PhD Degree from the University of Cambridge.

Pohjola has contributed to a number of research areas in economics, including applications of chaotic dynamic systems and dynamic game theory, labour economics, environmental economics, and economic growth. He has recently edited a volume entitled Information Technology, Productivity, and Economic Growth: International Evidence and Implications for Economic Development published by Oxford University Press (2001) and a special issue on the New Economy to be published in Information Economics and Policy in June 2002. His current research focuses on the impacts of the New Economy on productivity and economic growth and on the factors affecting the adoption and diffusion of information and communication technology.

Selected publications
• Social Corporatism: A Superior Economic System?, Clarendon Press 1991 (edited with Jukka Pekkarinen and Bob Rowthorn)

References

20th-century Finnish economists
Living people
Year of birth missing (living people)
21st-century Finnish economists